The Da Prata River is a river of Goiás state in central Brazil.

See also
List of rivers of Goiás

External links 
Mapa Rodoviario Goias 2002

Rivers of Goiás